Air Hogs is a line of toy airplanes, helicopters, rockets, and cars manufactured and owned by the Spin Master company of Toronto, Ontario, Canada. They are radio controlled, free-flying, and air-powered aircraft. Several of these, especially the remote-controlled (R/C) ones, are designed to be easily flown without any need for assembly.

Air Hogs was created in 1996 when Spin Master was approached by British inventors John Dixon and Peter Manning, whose prototype of a compressed air powered toy airplane had been rejected by everyone they had shown it to. Excited by the plane's potential, Spin Master licensed the technology and spent two years and half a million dollars perfecting the toy.

The Air Hogs Sky Shark debuted first in spring 1998 and was an immediate hit, fuelled by coverage on The Today Show and Live with Regis and Kathy Lee, as well as write-ups in Time and Popular Science.
 
Follow-up successes have included Zero Gravity RC Wall Crawler (a radio control Hummer-style vehicle that can be driven up walls), the popular Aero Ace battery powered RC airplanes, Air Hogs Stormlauncher (a vehicle that can operate on land, water, and can fly), Havoc Heli (a 6.5” long indoor RC helicopter weighing just 10 grams) and the Reflex Helicopter (indoor/outdoor fully functional r/c helicopter). Later on, The Stinger was released. In 2008, the Havoc Heli and Stinger were released together in a Laser Battle Pack. A new toy has also been released: the SwitchBlade; a twisting blade with smaller blades that launches vertically but flies straight forward. Another popular radio-control airplane is the Hawkeye Blue Sky which was released in 2011. It is the only airplane Air Hogs has built with a built-in spy camera on (there are a few indoor helicopters that have them, but no other airplanes).

External links
 Official website

Radio-controlled aircraft
Canadian brands